Cecil Textbook of Medicine (sometimes called Cecil Medicine or Goldman-Cecil Medicine) is a medical textbook published by Elsevier under the Saunders imprint. 

It was first published in 1927 as the Textbook of Medicine, by Russell LaFayette Cecil. In the United States, it is a prominent and widely consulted medical textbook. Cecil Medicine is often compared with Harrison's Principles of Internal Medicine, which it predates by three decades. Approximately one third of its authors are changed with each new edition. it is currently in its 26th edition published in January 2020.

History
It was first edited by Russell LaFayette Cecil.

See also
Lee Goldman

References

External links
Goldman Cecil Medicine

1927 non-fiction books
Elsevier books
Medical manuals